Suzanne Allday-Goodison (26 November 1934 – 26 July 2017) was an English female discus thrower and shot putter. She was born in Shoreham-by-Sea, West Sussex.

Athletics career
She represented Great Britain at three Summer Olympics: 1952, 1956 and 1960. She married hammer thrower Peter Allday, and was affiliated with the Brighton Ladies Athletic Club and the Spartan Ladies Athletic Club during her career.

In 1954 she won the first of four medals for England at the Commonwealth Games. The first was a silver medal in the discus at the 1954 British Empire and Commonwealth Games.

She represented England at the 1958 British Empire and Commonwealth Games in Cardiff winning a gold medal in the discus and a silver medal in the shot put.

Four years later she won a bronze medal in the shot put at the 1962 Commonwealth Games in Perth, Western Australia.

References

1934 births
2017 deaths
British female discus throwers
British female shot putters
Athletes (track and field) at the 1952 Summer Olympics
Athletes (track and field) at the 1956 Summer Olympics
Athletes (track and field) at the 1960 Summer Olympics
Olympic athletes of Great Britain
Athletes (track and field) at the 1954 British Empire and Commonwealth Games
Athletes (track and field) at the 1958 British Empire and Commonwealth Games
Athletes (track and field) at the 1962 British Empire and Commonwealth Games
Commonwealth Games gold medallists for England
Commonwealth Games silver medallists for England
Commonwealth Games bronze medallists for England
Commonwealth Games medallists in athletics
People from Shoreham-by-Sea
Medallists at the 1954 British Empire and Commonwealth Games
Medallists at the 1958 British Empire and Commonwealth Games
Medallists at the 1962 British Empire and Commonwealth Games